F. James Rohlf is an American biostatistician, currently a Distinguished Professor Emeritus at Stony Brook University  and Fellow of the American Association for the Advancement of Science.

Positions 
The University of Kansas, Lawrence, Kansas.  Research Assistant: 1958‑1959.  Teaching Assistant:  Fall 1959.  Research Associate: Summer 1962.  Visiting Assistant Professor of Entomology: Spring 1965.  Research Associate: Spring 1966.  Associate Professor of Statistical Biology: 1966‑1969.
The University of California, Santa Barbara, California.  Assistant Professor of Biology: 1962‑1966.
Dennis E. Slice is a professor in the Department of Scientific Computing at Florida State University and Honorarprofessor in the Department of Anthropology at the University of Vienna, Austria., Yorktown Heights, New York.  W. J. Eckert Visiting Environmental Scientist: 1976‑1977. Visiting Scientist: July 1978, June–July 1979, and 1980‑1981.
The State University of New York at Stony Brook.  Associate Professor of Biology: 1968‑1972.  Professor of Biology: 1972–2004. SUNY Distinguished Professor: 2004–2010; John S. Toll Professor, 2011–2013; Distinguished Professor, Emeritus: 2014–present. Research Professor 2014 – present.
The City University of New York, Adjunct member of the doctoral faculty of The Graduate School and University Center's Ph.D. Program in Anthropology. Oct. 2002 to present.

Education 
A.B. 1958. San Diego State College, San Diego, California.  Major in Zoology with minors in both Mathematics and Chemistry.
Ph.D. 1962. The University of Kansas, Lawrence, Kansas.  Major in Entomology with courses in Mathematics (statistics).

Honors 
W. J. Eckert Visiting Environmental Scientist.  IBM T. J. Watson Research Center, Yorktown Heights, New York.  1976‑1977.
Profesor Visitante.  Universidad Nacional del Litoral, Santa Fe, Argentina.  Sept. 1983.
Visiting Professor, University of Rome “La Sapienza,” Dipartimento di Biologia Animale e dell’Uomo, Rome, Italy.  Apr. & May 1997.
Honorary member of Colegiada dos Enófilos de São Vicente, Lisbon, Portugal, 1994.
Fellow of the American Academy of Arts and Sciences.
Visiting Scientist at Cooperative Research Centre for Freshwater Ecology, Dept. of Natural Resources and Environment, Heidelberg, Australia. July & August 2001.
Rohlfest: a symposium to celebrate his 65th birthday. Held at SUNY Stony Brook on November 3, 2001.
Honorable Tribute entered into the Congressional Record of the United States of America, Washington DC, Wednesday, May 5, 2004, by Representative Timothy H. Bishop.
Guest Professor, Institut für Anthropologie, University of Vienna. May/June 2004.
SUNY Distinguished Professor, State University of New York, Nov. 2004.
AAAS and NSF Scientific visualization challenge. Honorable Mention. Evolutionary Morphing: Statistical Interpolation of Ancestral Morphology Along an Evolutionary Tree. Nina Amenta and David Wiley, University of California, Davis; Eric Delson, City University of New York; F. James Rohlf, State University of New  York, Stony Brook; and colleagues. August 2005. www.sciencemag.org/sciext/vis2005/show/slide8.dtl.
PRIMES Distinguished Lecturer, Colorado  State University, Fort Collins, CO. November 2005.
American Association for the Advancement of Science. Elected 2006.
Alice Hamilton Award in the Human Studies Category, National Institute for Occupational Safety and Health, for the 2009 paper on Development of sizing structure for fall arrest harness design published in Ergonomics 52:1128-1143.
Nominated June 28, 2010 for the Charles C. Shepard Science Award in the category Prevention and Control for the 2009 paper on Development of sizing structure for fall arrest harness design published in Ergonomics 52:1128-1143.
2011 Individual honoree by Ride For Life (a charity that promotes awareness of amyotrophic lateral sclerosis, ALS, money for research and patient care). 3/16/2011.
Fulbright Specialist, Delhi University, New Delhi, India. 3/19/12 – 4/1/12.

University service 
Graduate Program in Ecology and Evolution, State University of New York. Director: 1974–1976, 2005–2006, member of Executive Committee.
Department of Ecology and Evolution, State University of New York. Acting Chairman: 1974–1975. Chairman: 1975–1980 and 1990‑1991. Chair and member of various committees.
Division of Biological Sciences, State University of New  York, Stony Brook.  Acting Provost: Sept. to Oct. 1978.  Director of Computing Services for Biological Sciences: 1984–1996.
University Committees: Computer Advisory Committee, Computer Policy Advisory Board, Academic Computer Policy Advisory Board, RFP technical writing committee for campus computing, Faculty Review of Computing committee, Subcommittee on Academic Computing, Provost's Advisory Committee on Computing and Communications, Biological Computing Oversight Committee, and Faculty Senate committee on Computing and Communications (served for many years). Member of President's task Force Committee on Academic Organization (Spring 2005). Search committee for the New  York Consortium on Computer Science. Provost's committee for science communication. Search committee for Provost (2007). Research and Development Park Oversight Board (2007-2009).

Professional service (past and present) 
Amer. Society of Naturalists. Editorial board: 1973‑1976.
Association for Computing Machinery.
Biometric Society: 1975-?.
Cell Biology Insights. Editorial board 2008-?.
Ciência e Têcnica Vitivinicola. Member of International Reading Committee 1994-?.
Classification Society.  1964–present. Program chairman: 1973; president of North American Branch: 1975–1978; president of council 1975–1976, board member: 1997–2003, 2006–2008; editorial board for the Journal of Classification: 1984–present; representative to IFCS Council: 2004–2007; manage the class-l listserver for the Classification Society.
Hystrix the Italian Journal of Mammalogy. Member of editorial board, 2014–present.
International Federation of Classification Societies. president: 1975‑1978, CSNA representative to Council 2004–2008; member of nominating committee Fall 2004; member of finance committee 2005–2006, chair of election committee 2006–2008.
Web-master for the Stony Brook morphometrics website at http://life.bio.sunysb.edu/morph.
Quarterly review of Biology. Software editor. 1988 ‑ 1994.
Society of Systematic Zoology. Editorial board: 1971‑1974; Counselor, 1975‑1977.
U. S. National Academy of Science.  Member of study panel on discrimination and clustering: 1982‑1983.
New York Consortium in Evolutionary Primatology (NYCEP). Resource Faculty Member, 2002–present.
Journal of Evolutionary Biology, editorial board member, 2005–2012.
Journal of Morphology, associate editor, 2005–present.
The Open Evolution Journal, editorial board member, 2007-?.
Editorial board of Anthropology and Archaeology – Open Journal. 2010-?.
Established the "Rohlf Medal" for Excellence in Morphometric Methods and Applications in 2006.

Lectured at and/or organized workshops on geometric morphometrics 
Ann Arbor, Michigan, 1988. Univ. of Michigan.
Stony Brook, New York, 1990.  State Univ. of New York at Stony Brook.
Valsain, Spain, 1991. Organized by Museo Nacional de Ciencias Naturales, Madrid.
Paris, France, 1992.  Museum national d'Histoire Naturelle.
Il Ciocco, Italy, 1993. NATO Advanced Study Institute.
Taipei, Taiwan, 1997. Academia Sinica, ROC.
Rome, Italy, 1997, 1998. Univ. of Rome, "La sapienza".
Vienna, Austria, 1998, 2006, 2008. Institute of Human Biology, at the University of Vienna, Austria.
Durban, South Africa, 2000. Univ. of Natal.
Santiago, Chile, 2001. Univ. of Chile.
Rome, Italy. 2002. Museo Civico di Zoologia di Roma.
Halifax, N.S., Canada. 2004. Dalhousie Univ.
Umeå, Sweden. 2004. Umeå University.
Lisbon, Portugal. 2004. University of Lisbon.
Ames, Iowa. 2006. Iowa State University.
Ankara, Turkey. 2006. Middle East Technical University.
Vienna, Austria. 2006. Institut für Anthropologie, University of Vienna.
New Delhi, India. 2012. Delhi University.

Publications (recent first) 
 Rohlf, F. J. 2020. Why Clusters and Other Patterns Can Seem to be Found in Analyses of High‑ Dimensional Data. Evolutionary Biology. https://doi.org/10.1007/s11692-020-09518-6
 Cardini, Andrea, O'Higgins, Paul, Rohlf, F. James. 2019. Seeing distinct groups where there are none: spurious patterns from between-group PCA. Evolutionary Biology. 46:303–316. http://biorxiv.org/cgi/content/short/706101v1
 Braga, José and Veronika Zimmer, Jean Dumoncel, Chafik Samir, Clément Zanolli, Débora Pinto, F. James Rohlf, Frederick Grine. 2019. Efficacy of diffeomorphic surface matching and 3D geometric morphometrics for taxonomic discrimination of Early Pleistocene hominin mandibular molars. J. Human Evol. 130:21-35.
 Rohlf, F. J. 2017. The method of random skewers. Evolutionary Biology 44:542-550. http://dx.doi.org/10.1007/s11692-017-9425-8
 Martinez, C. M., F. J. Rohlf, and M. G. Frisk. 2016. Sexual dimorphism in sister species of Leucoraja skate and its relationship to reproductive strategy and life history. Evolution and Development. 18:105-115.
 Martinez, C. M., F. J. Rohlf, and M. G. Frisk. 2016. Re-evaluation of batoid pectoral morphology reveals novel patterns of diversity among major lineages. Journal of Morphology 277:482-493.
 Rohlf, F. J. 2016. Some notes on the early years of the Classification Society. Classification Society Newsletter 87:3-5.
 Sclove, S. L. and F. J. Rohlf. 2016. The Classification Society: the first fifty years. Classification Society Newsletter 87:6-20.
 Smaers, J. B. and F. J. Rohlf. 2016. Testing species’ deviation from allometric predictions using the phylogenetic regression. Evolution, 70:1145-1149.
 Rohlf, F.J. 2015. The tps series of software. Hystrix: The Italian Journal of Mammalogy, 26:1-4.
 Sibony, P., M. J. Kupersmith, R. Honkanen, F. J. Rohlf, and A. Torab-Parhiz. 2014. Effects of lowering cerebrosphinal fluid pressure on the shape of the peripapillary retina in intracranial hypertension. Investigative ophthalmology & visual science. 55:8223-8231.
 Baab, K. L., J. M. G. Perry, F. J. Rohlf, and W. L. Jungers. 2014. Phylogenetic, Ecological, and Allometric Correlates of Cranial Shape in Malagasy Lemuriforms. Evolution, 68:1450-1468.
 Siver, P. A., A. P. Wolfe, F. J. Rohlf, W. Shin, and B. Y. Jo. 2013. Combining geometric morphometrics, molecular phylogeny, and micro¬paleontology to assess evolu¬tionary patterns in Mallomonas (Synurophyceae: Heterokontophyta). Geobiology, 11:127-138.
 Bland, J. M., D. G. Altman, and F. J. Rohlf. 2013. In defense of the logarithmic transformation. Statistics in Medicine, 32:3766-3769.
 Adams, D. C., F. J. Rohlf, and D. E. Slice. 2013?. A field comes of age: geometric morphometrics in the 21st century. Hystrix, 24:7-14.
Host genes related to Paneth cells and xenobiotic metabolism are associated with shifts in human ileum-associated microbial composi¬tion. PLoS ONE, 7(6):e30044. 7pp.
 Cruz,  R. A. L., M. J. R. Pante, and F. J. Rohlf. 2012. Geometric Analysis of Shell Shape Variation in Conus (Gastropoda: Conidae). Zoological Journal of the Linnean Society, 165:296-310.
 Li, E., C. M. Hamm, A. Gulati, R. B. Sartor, H. Chen, X. Wu, T. Zhang, F. J. Rohlf,  W. Zhu, C. Gu, C. E. Robertson,  N. R. Pace, E. C. Boedeker, N. Harpaz, J. Yuan, G. M. Weinstock, E. Sodergren, D. N. Frank. 2012.  Inflammatory bowel diseases phenotype, C. difficile and NOD2 genotype are associated with shifts in human ileum associated microbial composition. PLoS ONE, 7(6): e26284. 10pp.
 Sibony, P.; Kupersmith, M.; Rohlf, F. J. 2011. Shape analysis of the peripapillary RPE layer in papilledema and ischemic optic neuropathy. Investigative Ophthalmology & Visual Science, 52:7987-7995.
 Perez, S. I., J. A. Diniz-Filho, F. J. Rohlf, and S. F. dos Reis. 2009. Ecological and Evolutionary Factors in the Morphological Diversification of South American Spiny Rats. Biological Journal of the Linnean Society, 98:646-660.
 Adams, D. C., A. Cardini, L. R. Monteiro, P. O’Higgins, and F. J. Rohlf. 2011. Morphometrics and Phylogenetics: principal components of shape from cranial modules are neither appropriate nor effective cladistic characters. Journal of Human Evolution, 60:240-243.
 Hsiao, H., M. Friess, B. Bradtmiller, and F. J. Rohlf. 2009. Development of sizing structure for fall arrest harness design. Ergonomics, 52:1128-1143.
 (147 more to come)

References

External links
SBmorphometrics with links that include software, notices, glossary, history

Living people
Stony Brook University faculty
Evolutionary biologists
University of Kansas alumni
1936 births